Franck Tournaire (born 4 December 1972 in Narbonne) is a former French international professional rugby union player now playing amateur rugby for US Carcassonne.

As a prop, Tournaire played for Narbonne, Toulouse, Leicester, Perpignan and Narbonne again, ending in Pro D2 his professional career at the Racing Métro 92 Paris.

After retiring in 2008, Tournaire joined amateur club US Carcassonne in southern France.

Tournaire won 49 full caps for the French national team and won 2 Five Nations (1997 and 1998 both Grand Slams) and played in the 1999 Rugby World Cup where France were the runners-up losing in the final to Australia.

External links 
lequipe.fr 
Profile on French federation official site
www.scrum.com
www.ercrugby.co

1972 births
Living people
People from Narbonne
French rugby union players
Stade Toulousain players
Leicester Tigers players
Rugby union props
France international rugby union players
Sportspeople from Aude
US Carcassonne players
RC Narbonne players
Racing 92 players
USA Perpignan players
French expatriate sportspeople in England
French expatriate rugby union players
Expatriate rugby union players in England